Edge is a former civil parish, now in the parishes of No Man's Heath and District and Malpas, in Cheshire West and Chester, England.  It  contains 18 buildings that are recorded in the National Heritage List for England as designated listed buildings.  One of these is listed at Grade II*, the middle grade, and the rest at the lowest grade, Grade II.  The parish is entirely rural, and most of the listed buildings are domestic, or related to farming.  The most important building is the country house, Edge Hall, which dates from about 1600.  Many of the other listed buildings are houses and cottages, either timber-framed or with a timber-framed core, dating from the 17th century.  Other structures in the list include a former corn mill, former stables, and a bridge near Edge Hall.

Key

Buildings

See also
Listed buildings in Bickerton
Listed buildings in Bradley
Listed buildings in Cholmondeley
Listed buildings in Duckington
Listed buildings in Egerton
Listed buildings in Malpas
Listed buildings in Marbury cum Quoisley
Listed buildings in Norbury
Listed buildings in Tilston
Listed buildings in Tushingham cum Grindley

References
Citations

Sources

Listed buildings in Cheshire West and Chester
Lists of listed buildings in Cheshire
Listed buildings in Edge, Cheshire